Dimoria College, is a general degree college situated at Khetri in Kamrup district, Assam. This college is affiliated with the Gauhati University. This college offers different courses in arts and science.

History
The college was stablished on 29 August 1979.

References

External links
http://dimoriacollege.ac.in/

Universities and colleges in Assam
Colleges affiliated to Gauhati University
Educational institutions in India with year of establishment missing
1979 establishments in India
Educational institutions established in 1979